The Triumph of Love is a 1922 Australian silent film directed by P. J. Ramster. It is a South Seas romance starring Jack Chalmers, a Sydney lifesaver who was famous at the time for trying to save a swimmer from a shark.

It is considered to be a lost film.

Plot
Four men and a young woman (Coo-ee Knight) are shipwrecked on an island in the South Seas. The men fight over the woman.

Production
The film was shot in April 1922, with interiors filmed the Palmerston studio in Waverley, and some location work in Queensland. The female lead Coo-Ee Knight was from Hobart.

References

External links

Triumph of Love at National Film and Sound Archive

1922 films
Australian drama films
Australian silent films
Australian black-and-white films
1922 drama films
Lost Australian films
1922 lost films
Lost drama films
Silent drama films
1920s English-language films